The 23rd TCA Awards were presented by the Television Critics Association. John Oliver hosted the ceremony  on July 21 at the Beverly Hilton Hotel.

Winners and nominees

Multiple wins 
The following shows received multiple wins:

Multiple nominations 
The following shows received multiple nominations:

References

External links
Official website
2007 TCA Awards at IMDb.com

2007 television awards
2007 in American television
TCA Awards ceremonies